The Shire of Ballarat was a local government area immediately to the northwest and west of the regional city of Ballarat, Victoria, Australia.

History

Ballarat was first incorporated as a road district on 7 October 1856, and became a shire on 24 November 1863.

Although much of the detail of the Ballarat Shire Council is obscure, Donald Gunn was a Councillor between August 1865 - June 1867, and again between August 1870 - August 1876. He was President of the Shire from 11 November 1872 until 21 October 1874. In 1964, the shire offices moved from Learmonth to Wendouree.

On 6 May 1994, the Shire of Ballarat was abolished, and along with the City of Ballaarat, the Borough of Sebastopol and parts of the Shires of Bungaree, Buninyong, Grenville and Ripon, was merged into the newly created City of Ballarat.

Wards

The Shire of Ballarat was divided into four ridings on 11 November 1952, each of which elected three councillors:
 Alfredton Riding
 Central Riding
 Rural Riding
 Showgrounds Riding

Towns and localities
 Addington
 Ascot
 Alfredton (shared with the City of Ballaarat)
 Bald Hills
 Ballarat North
 Blowhard
 Burrumbeet
 Cardigan
 Cardigan Village
 Coghills Creek
 Dowling
 Glendaruel
 Invermay Park
 Learmonth
 Miners Rest
 Mitchell Park
 Mount Rowan
 Sulky
 Tourello
 Weatherboard
 Wendouree*
 Windermere

* Council seat.

Population

* Estimate in 1958 Victorian Year Book.

References

External links
 Victorian Places - Ballarat Shire

Ballarat